The 1987–88 Egyptian Premier League is the 31 season of the Egyptian Premier League since its establishment in 1948. It was contested by one group of 12 teams.

League table

References

 angelfire.com

8
1
1987–88 in African association football leagues